This is a list of Statutory Instruments made in the United Kingdom in 2020.

1–100

101–200

201–300

301–400

401–500

501–600

601–700

701–800

801–900

901–1000

1001–1100

1101–1669

Further reading

List of Acts of the Parliament of the United Kingdom, 2020–present#2020
United Kingdom legislation connected with the COVID-19 pandemic

Notes

References

External links
 Coronavirus Statutory Instruments dashboard – Hansard Society

Law of the United Kingdom
2020 in British law
2020 in British politics
Lists of Statutory Instruments of the United Kingdom